Muhammad Mustafa Al-A'zami (1930 – 20 December 2017) was an Indian-born Saudi Arabian contemporary hadith scholar best known for his critical investigation of the theories of fellow Islamic scholars Ignác Goldziher, David Margoliouth, and Joseph Schacht.

Life and education
He was born in Mau, India then in the Azamgarh district (hence his nisba) in the early part of the year 1930. Al-A'zami received his education successively at Darul Uloom Deoband (1952), Al-Azhar University (M.A., 1955), and the University of Cambridge in the United Kingdom (Ph.D., 1966).

Career
Azmi was a Professor Emeritus at King Saud University where he also chaired the department of Islamic Studies. He served as curator of the National Public Library of Qatar, Associate Professor at Umm al-Qura University, visiting scholar at the University of Michigan (Ann Arbor), Visiting Fellow at St Cross College, Oxford, King Faisal Visiting Professor for Islamic Studies at Princeton University, and visiting scholar at the University of Colorado at Boulder. He was also an Honorary Fellow in Islamic Studies at the University of Wales, Trinity Saint David.

Awards and recognition
In 1980, he was the recipient of the King Faisal International Award for Islamic Studies. Much of A'zami's work focused on challenging Western scholarship on hadith literature, especially on highlighting the fact that there was already intense literary activity on hadiths during the lifetime of the Muslim prophet Muhammad, at his encouragement.

Literary works 
Studies in Early Hadith Literature, His doctoral thesis at the University of Cambridge
Hadith Methodology and Literature, a general introduction to the subject
The History of the Qur'anic Text from Revelation to Compilation: A Comparative Study with the Old and New Testaments
On Schacht's Origins of Muhammadan Jurisprudence
Dirasat fi al-Hadith an-Nabawi
Kuttab an-Nabi
Manhaj an-Naqd 'ind al-Muhaddithin
al-Muhaddithun min al-Yamamah

His forthcoming works include The Qurʾānic Challenge: A Promise Fulfilled and The ʾIsnād System: Its Origins and Authenticity.

Edited works 
al-ʿIlal of Ibn al-Madini
Kitāb at-Tamyiz of Imam Muslim
Maghāzi Rasulullah of Urwah ibn Zubayr
Muwatta Imam Malik
Sahih Ibn Khuzaymah
Sunan ibn Majah

Death
Muhammad Mustafa Azmi died on 20 December 2017, aged 87.

References

Bibliography 
 الشيخ محمد مصطفى الأعظمي ومساهمته العلمية في الحديث النبوي
الشيخ محمد مصطفى الأعظمي ومساهماته العلمية في مجال الحديث النبوي: دراسة استقرائية

External links 
 Interview with al-A'zami (In the Arabic language)
 King Faisal International Award for Islamic Studies, 1980, winner: Al-A'zami

Saudi Arabian curators
1930 births
2017 deaths
People from Mau
Hadith scholars
Fellows of St Cross College, Oxford
Princeton University faculty
University of Michigan faculty
University of Colorado Boulder faculty
People associated with University of Wales Trinity Saint David
Academic staff of King Saud University
20th-century Indian Muslims
Biographical evaluation scholars
Deobandis
People from Azamgarh
Muslim scholars of Islamic studies